Sunny Wang is a Taiwanese-American actor and model. He was born on November 2, 1982, in New York, New York, United States of Taiwanese origin. He pursued his post-secondary education at New York University, Stern school of business and Tisch school of arts, majoring in business and minoring in film studies. Wang is fluent in both English and Mandarin Chinese.

Career
Wang debuted as a model and officially joined the show business with his debut drama In Time with You. Before he started his career as an actor, one of his previous notable work as a model was for a charity photo shoot known as "Important Person" for a Taiwanese magazine. In 2012, Wang starred in Once Upon a Love which also stars actress Cheryl Yang.

Along with several close friends, Wang developed a silver jewelry brand called Imperial Taels around 2010. The brand is majorly influenced by renown silver jewelry brand Chrome Hearts and Chinese art.

Personal life
Wang moved to Taiwan shortly after birth and did not return to the States until he was seven. He grew up in the States with his grandma, mother and younger sister Yvonne, who is six years younger. Wang had loved to perform since young, but his family wanted him to complete his studies and also to work in the family business. After several years of working for his uncle, traveling around Asia, he eventually decide to pursue his dream to enter the entertainment scene and taken up a role in drama, with the help of ex-girlfriend Elva Hsiao. Prior to his debut, he was widely known as the ex-boyfriend of the singer. Wang met Elva in 2003 during his university winter holiday return to Taiwan. Their relationship ended in March, 2005. They got together again 8 months later but broke up again. The two currently are under the same agency and manager. He made his debut as the second male lead of In Time with You and received attention for his role and tattoos. He also founded the streetwear and accessories brand Imperial Taels (金銀帝國) with partners Ryan Yeh and designer Chuck lee in 2010.

Wang announced his relationship with Australian-Taiwanese singer songwriter Dominique Choy in early 2015. They met in 2005 and their relationship first began in 2007, but did not further due to long distance. They rekindled their romance again in late 2014, and got engaged in April 2015. On December 27, 2015, Wang married Choy in Sydney, Australia.

Filmography

Television

Film

Music videos

References

External links
 Sunny Wang's Official WeiBo 

1982 births
Living people
Male actors from Taipei
Taiwanese male film actors
Taiwanese male television actors
21st-century Taiwanese male actors
New York University alumni